Querco  may refer to:
 Querco, Peru, a town, capital city of the Querco District, a district of the Huaytará province in Peru
 Nonconvex great rhombicuboctahedron